Jesús Larraza Renovales (20 July 1903 – 7 May 1926) was a Spanish footballer. He competed in the men's tournament at the 1924 Summer Olympics.

Biography
He spent his whole career with Athletic Club, a career that only lasted four years, between 1922 and 1926, since he died in a motorcycle accident when he was only 22 years old. Jesús had an accident on 27 May 1926 with his Harley-Davidson along with a friend who also died in the accident when he went off the road. His last match as a footballer dates back to 13 May, when he played a friendly against Real Sociedad (2-1). He earned one cap for the Spanish national team on 25 May 1924 against Italy, in a match that ended with Spanish elimination from the 1924 Summer Olympics after losing 0-1, with Larraza being sent off in the 55th when the game was still leveled at 0-0.

References

External links
 

1903 births
1926 deaths
Spanish footballers
Spain international footballers
Olympic footballers of Spain
Footballers at the 1924 Summer Olympics
People from Basauri
Association football forwards
Athletic Bilbao footballers
Footballers from the Basque Country (autonomous community)
Road incident deaths in Spain
Sportspeople from Biscay